Tamar Taliashvili (born 13 December 1978) is a Georgian politician. Since 2020, she has been a member of the Parliament of Georgia of the 10th convocation by party list, election bloc: „Georgian Dream - Democratic Georgia“.

References

People from Georgia (country)
1978 births
Living people